Baltimore Block is a series of eight rowhouses in the SoNo district of Atlanta, Georgia. Rowhouses of the kind that are abundant in Baltimore are an unusual housing type in Atlanta, where duplexes or semidetached housing, such as shotgun houses, were more common forms of high-density housing. Built in 1885 by Baltimore native Jacob J. Rosenthal, the houses were leased on long-term ground lease terms, a common practice in Baltimore. By the 1920s, the houses began to fall out of fashion, and four units were torn down while the others became derelict. A recovery began in the 1930s, and in the 1960s the area became a center of counterculture.  Extensive renovation took place during the 1980s, when the units were consolidated and converted to office use.

Like many Baltimore houses, the brick three-story rowhouses of Baltimore Block present a unified wall-like front to the street with a continuous cornice line.

Photo gallery

References

External links

Baltimore Block, Atlanta Urban Design Commission
Baltimore Block, GeorgiaInfo

Residential buildings on the National Register of Historic Places in Georgia (U.S. state)
Houses completed in 1885
Buildings and structures in Atlanta
National Register of Historic Places in Atlanta